The Citroën Xsara is a compact C-segment family car, produced by the French automaker PSA Peugeot Citroën, under their Citroën marque, from 1997 to 2006. The Xsara was a development of the Citroën ZX and Peugeot 306, which shared a platform and running gear.

It came in three and five door hatchback (notchback) and five door estate body styles; the estate was marketed as the Break and the three door as the Coupé. The styling shared cues with the larger Bertone designed Xantia, but was regarded as bland by the motoring press.

The straight four engine range includes 1.4, 1.6, 1.8 and 2.0 litre petrol engines as well as 1.6, 1.9 and 2.0 litre naturally aspirated and turbocharged diesels. In some countries, such as Portugal, the 1.5 litre TUD5 diesel engine was also available. The Xsara was 1998 Semperit Irish Car of the Year in Ireland.

Chassis design

The familiar range of PSA powertrains drove the front wheels of a seemingly conventionally designed chassis. At the front was a standard MacPherson strut layout with anti-roll bar, while the rear used the PSA Peugeot-Citroën fully independent trailing arm/torsion bar set up, which was first introduced on the estate of the Peugeot 305.

However, PSA's chassis engineers employed some unusual features, including passive rear wheel steering, though less than on the ZX, (by means of specially designed compliance bushes in the rear suspension), and inhouse developed and constructed shock absorbers.

At high mileages, this is prone to wear of the axle mounting bushes which is easily fixed. It is also prone to wear in the rear axle trailing arm bearings, which then wear the trailing arm axle tubes, requiring an expensive rebuild or a replacement axle assembly.

The diesel and larger capacity petrol engines are canted as far back as possible in the engine bay, in an effort to put as much weight as possible behind the front axle line, also reducing the centre of gravity, while improving weight distribution and minimising understeer.

Overview

Pre-facelift

The original Xsara was launched in September 1997, and was available with different engine choices:
1.4L (1361 cc 8 valve SOHC)  TU3JP 4-cylinder petrol 111 N·m
1.6L (1587 cc)    TU5JP four cylinder petrol 136 N·m
1.8L (1761 cc)    XU7JB four cylinder petrol
1.8L (1761 cc)    XU7JP four cylinder petrol
1.8L (1761 cc 16-valve DOHC)  XU7JP4 four cylinder petrol 155 N·m
2.0L (1998 cc)    XU10J2C four cylinder petrol
2.0L (1998 cc 16 valve DOHC)    XU10J4R four cylinder petrol
2.0L (1998 cc 16 valve DOHC)    XU10J4RS four cylinder petrol (used in Xsara VTS)
1.5L (1527 cc)  43 kW (58 PS; 57 hp) TUD5 diesel
1.9L (1905 cc)    XUD9A diesel
1.9L (1868 cc)    DW8 diesel
1.9L (1905 cc)    XUD9B SD diesel
1.9L (1905 cc)    XUD9TE turbodiesel
2.0L (1997 cc)    DW10TD turbodiesel
2.0L (1997 cc)    DW10ATED turbodiesel

Facelift

In September 2000 for the 2001 model year, the Xsara was facelifted. The car was now stiffer (safety and handling improved), had a new front design and some interior modifications (i.e.: new steering wheel). The facelift also saw the introduction of multiplex wiring.

New 1.6i and 2.0i 16 valve engines were being introduced and 1.8L were removed. Now Xsara is offered with following engine choices:

1.4L (1361 cc 8 valve SOHC)  TU3JP four cylinder petrol 121 N·m (catalyst and its position were changed).
1.6L (1587 cc 16 valve DOHC)  TU5JP4 four cylinder petrol (new, replaced 8-valve TU5JP engine)
2.0L (1998 cc 16 valve DOHC)  XU10J4RS four cylinder petrol (used till 2002)
2.0L (1998 cc 16 valve DOHC)  EW10J4 four cylinder petrol (new, replaced XU10 engine)
1.4L (1398 cc)  HDI 50 KW 68 PS DW4TD 01. 2004–31 December 2004
1.5L (1527 cc)  43 kW (58 PS; 57 hp) TUD5 diesel
1.9L (1868 cc)    DW8 diesel (used till 2002)
1.9L (1868 cc)    DW8B diesel (new)
2.0L (1997 cc)    DW10TD turbodiesel (catalyst was changed, later central silencer was removed)
2.0L (1997 cc)    DW10ATED turbodiesel (new)

The model of 2002 had slight interior modifications (e.g. a different way of controlling the sound system from the steering wheel). In February 2003, there were also some exterior modifications (e.g. new front bumper, new instrument panel design with Eurostile typeface (to replace the Futura typeface) with dial design from the Peugeot 307).

The Xsara hatchback was discontinued in Europe, and replaced by the C4 in November 2004. Dongfeng Peugeot-Citroën Automobile, a joint venture between Dongfeng and the PSA Group, continued to manufacture the Xsara hatchback one more year.

In Europe, the Xsara Estate continued to be produced until 2006 and did not get a replacement. The Xsara Picasso small MPV was continued, concurrently with its successor that was based on the C4, 'Picasso' becoming the name for MPV derivatives of any Citroën model.

See also
Citroën Total World Rally Team

References

External links

Xsara Picasso Official UK site
Xsara model information
Citroën Crash Test Xsara
Meaning of word "Xsara"

Xsara
Compact cars
Euro NCAP small family cars
Hot hatches
Station wagons
2000s cars
Cars introduced in 1997
Rally cars